Segun may refer to:
 Segun, a variant of the Nigerian name Olusegun
 Según, a Spanish preposition